Malonovlenskoye is a rural locality (a village) in Kubenskoye Rural Settlement, Vologodsky District, Vologda Oblast, Russia. The population was 132 as of 2002. There are 4 streets.

Geography 
Malonovlenskoye is located 54 km northwest of Vologda (the district's administrative centre) by road. Verkhnevologodsky is the nearest rural locality.

References 

Rural localities in Vologodsky District